Ephron is a Jewish surname. Notable people with the surname include:

 Ephron (biblical figure), Hittite who sold a cave to Abraham according to the Bible
A family of American writers:
 Henry Ephron (1911–1992), father
 Phoebe Ephron (1914–1971), mother
 Amy Ephron (born 1952), daughter
 Delia Ephron (born 1944), daughter
 Hallie Ephron (born 1948), daughter, sometimes writes as G. H. Ephron
 Nora Ephron (1941–2012), daughter
Theron Ephron Catlin (1878–1960), American politician from Missouri

See also
 Efron

Hebrew-language surnames
Jewish surnames
Yiddish-language surnames